Bishnupur or Vishnupur may refer to:

Administrative divisions
 Bishnupur district in Manipur, India
 Bishnupur district, West Bengal in West Bengal, India
 Bishnupur subdivision in West Bengal, India

Municipal division
 Bishnupur Rural Municipality, Saptari, a rural municipal division in Province No. 2, Nepal
 Bishnupur Rural Municipality, Siraha, a rural municipal division in Province No. 2, Nepal

CD Blocks
 Bishnupur, Bankura (community development block) in Bankura district, West Bengal, India
 Bishnupur I - Community development block in South 24 Parganas district, West Bengal, India
 Bishnupur II - Community development block in South 24 Parganas district, West Bengal, India

Electoral constituencies
 Bishnupur (Lok Sabha constituency) in Bankura district, West Bengal, India
 Bishnupur, Bankura (Vidhan Sabha constituency) in West Bengal
 Bishnupur, South 24 Parganas (Vidhan Sabha constituency) in West Bengal
 Bishnupur (Manipur Legislative Assembly constituency), in Manipur

Towns and villages
 Bishnupur, Manipur, a town in Bishnupur District, Manipur, India
 Bishnupur, Bankura, a town in Bankura District in West Bengal, India, noted for its archaeological importance
 Bishnupur, South 24 Parganas a town in South 24 Parganas district in West Bengal, India
 Bishnupur, North 24 Parganas, a census town in North 24 Parganas district in West Bengal, India
 Bishnupur, Bara, a village in Nepal
 Bishnupur, Mahottari, a village in Nepal
 Bishnupur, in Shillong taluk, East Khasi Hills district, Meghalaya, India
 South Bishnupur (South 24 Parganas), an area in Mandirbazar, West Bengal, India
 Vishnupuri, Nanded, a village in Nanded district, Maharashtra, India
 Vishnupur Ratwara, a village in Sitamarhi district, Bihar, India
 Vishnupur, a village in West Godavari district, Andhra Pradesh, India
 Bishnupur, Birbhum, a census town in West Bengal, India

Other uses
 Bishnupur Kingdom, a mediaeval kingdom of Bankura district, West Bengal, India
 Bishnupur gharana, a form of singing which originated in Bishnupur, Bankura

See also
 Bishunpur (disambiguation)
 Vishnupuram Ilakkiya Vattam, an Indian literary organization created by Tamil writer Jeyamohan
 Vishnupuram Award, an Indian award for Tamil literature
 Vishnu Puran (TV series), an Indian series which aired in 2003
 Vishnu Purana, one of the eighteen Mahapuranas, a genre of ancient and medieval texts of Hinduism